Boully or de Boully is a surname. Notable people with the surname include:

Harry Boully (1879–1970), Australian rules footballer
Jenny Boully (born 1976), American author
Monny de Boully (1904-1968), Franco-Serbian writer and poet